Marananga is a locality in South Australia. It was known as Gnadenfrei before 1918 when names of "enemy origin" were changed to sound less German.

The Gnadenfrei Lutheran Church was established, then a German school was established in 1879. The school's name was changed to Marananga in 1918, which is now also the name of the locality. Gnadenfrei means 'grace' and 'freedom'. Marananga means "My hands" in the Aboriginal language of the Overland Corner tribe.

Tourism
Marananga is now viewed as an ideal tourism location within the Barossa, home to wineries, restaurants, accommodation venues, and even a gin distillery.

Wineries
 Greenock Creek Wines
 Two Hands Wines
 Tscharkes Place
 Heritage Wines

Distilleries
 Seppeltsfield Road Distillers

Restaurant/Eateries
 Bar Three 75
 Appellation 

Accommodation
 The Louise, Barossa
 The Villas

References

Towns in South Australia